The Buddhist Liberal Democratic Party (BLDP) was a Cambodian political party founded in 1993 by former Cambodian Prime Minister Son Sann. The BLDP was created as a successor to the Khmer People's National Liberation Front (KPNLF), an anti-communist group also started by Son Sann.

1993 Cambodian election
The BLDP won ten seats in the 1993 Cambodian election, and partnered in the resulting coalition government with the Funcinpec and the Cambodian People's Party.

Split
Rivalry between Son Sann and fellow party leader Ieng Mouly led to a split within the party that resulted in its dissolution in 1997. In 1998, Ieng Mouly's faction formed the Buddhist Liberal Party, while Son Sann's supporters created the Son Sann Party. Both successor parties failed to capture even a single seat in the 1998 election. The BLDP was a founding body of the Council of Asian Liberals and Democrats.

General election results

References

1993 establishments in Cambodia
1997 disestablishments in Cambodia
Buddhist political parties
Defunct liberal political parties
Defunct political parties in Cambodia
Liberal parties in Cambodia
Political parties disestablished in 1997
Political parties established in 1993